Santo, Sam and Ed's Sports Fever! was an Australian sports themed comedy television show hosted by Santo Cilauro, Sam Pang and Ed Kavalee. It screened from 30 January to 2 April 2012. It screened live-to-air on 7mate on Monday nights at 8:30 pm and was later replayed the same night on Seven at 11:30 pm.

Santo, Sam and Ed's Sports Fever! was produced by Working Dog Productions, and was filmed in Melbourne. It was a spin-off from Santo, Sam and Ed's Cup Fever!, an association football themed comedy television show which screened on SBS during the duration of the 2010 FIFA World Cup. It was succeeded by Santo, Sam and Ed's Total Football on Fox Sports in 2013, another association football based show.

See also

Santo, Sam and Ed's Cup Fever!
Santo, Sam and Ed's Total Football

References

External links

Seven Network original programming
2012 Australian television series debuts
2012 Australian television series endings
English-language television shows
Australian sports television series
Australian comedy television series